Brasiliana may refer to:
 , general term for things, collections related to Brazil
 Brasiliana, a genus of planthoppers in the family Fulgoridae
 Brasiliana, a genus of birds in the family Trochilidae, synonym of Hylocharis
 Brasiliana, a genus of mites in the family Ixodidae, synonym of Amblyomma